Stanford G. Ross (October 9, 1931 – August 26, 2020) was an American attorney who served as the Commissioner of the Social Security Administration from 1978 to 1979.

Ross was born in St. Louis, Missouri. He went to Washington University as an undergraduate and went to Harvard Law School for his law degree. For four years he was a professor at the New York University School of Law, before becoming a White House staff assistant in 1967. From 1968-1969 he was the General Counsel for the Department of the Treasury. After resigning from the Commissioner of the Social Security Administration, he began a law firm with Joseph A. Califano.

Ross was married to his wife, Dorothy, for sixty two years. He had two children and two grandchildren. Ross died of heart failure on August 26, 2020, in Washington, D.C. at age 88.

References

1931 births
2020 deaths
Carter administration personnel
Commissioners of the Social Security Administration
Washington University in St. Louis alumni
Harvard Law School alumni